Savage Life 4 is the fourth studio album by American rapper Webbie. The album was released on November 19, 2013, by Trill Entertainment. The album features guest appearances from Lil Phat, Lloyd, Blake and Lil Trill.

Singles
On April 16, 2013, the album's first single "What I Do" was released. On May 20, 2013, the music video was released for "What I Do". On October 8, 2013, the album's second single "Bad Bitch 2" was released. On November 19, 2013, the music video was released for "Bad Bitch 2".

Critical reception

Upon its release Savage Life 4 was met with generally mixed reviews from music critics. David Jeffries of AllMusic gave the album two and a half stars out of five, saying "No dirty, C-Murder-like album this time out as the rapper offers his prom song 2013 nomination with the sweet and sugary "Realest," and speaking of high school, "Big" comes on with a Freshman-caliber marching band for its backbeat and offers motivational lyrics to support the home team's annual highlight reel. Hopefully, the coach and his selection committee don't stick around for the slice of life called "Mine" ("I'll probably take her home, and let her get her slurp on"), or the slippery strip club track "Too Much," where Webbie discovers his chosen dancer does "take out" ("Playin' hard to get, but I'm gonna get in there and do time/The lady got her own hotel, she don't need mine"), but these gutter-minded songs are the easy and effortless highlights of the effort, coming off as much more natural than the plays for radio. Trim away the fat and there's a lean, and quite mean, mixtape inside this scattershot album."

Commercial performance
The album debuted at number 27 on the Billboard 200, with first-week sales of 11,918 copies in the United States.

Track listing

Charts

Weekly charts

Year-end charts

References

2013 albums
Webbie albums
Sequel albums